John Jerome Ohala (July 19, 1941 – August 22, 2020) was a linguist specializing in phonetics and phonology. He was a Professor Emeritus in linguistics at the University of California, Berkeley.

Career
He received his PhD in linguistics in 1969 from the University of California, Los Angeles (UCLA); his graduate advisor was Peter Ladefoged.  He is best known for his insistence that many aspects of languages' phonologies (a.k.a. "sound patterns") derive from physical and physiological constraints which are independent of language and thus have no place in the "grammar" of a language, i.e. what speakers have to learn inductively from exposure to the speech community into which they are born.

He also proposed that ethological principles influence certain aspects of languages' prosodic patterns, sound symbolism, and facial expressions, such as lip and brow movements.

References

Further reading

1941 births
2020 deaths
Phoneticians
American phonologists
University of California, Berkeley faculty
University of California, Los Angeles alumni
Linguists from the United States
Fellows of the Linguistic Society of America